Nolde is a hamlet in the Dutch province of Drenthe. It is located in the municipality of De Wolden, about 4 km south of Zuidwolde. The postal authorities have placed it under .

References

Populated places in Drenthe
De Wolden